RNRMC (full name Royal Navy and Royal Marines Charity) is a charity registered in England, Wales and Scotland. Its purpose is to support sailors, marines, and their families, including those from the Royal Navy, Royal Marines, Maritime Reserves, QARNNS (Queen Alexandra's Royal Naval Nursing Service), the Royal Fleet Auxiliary and former members of the now defunct Women's Royal Naval Service.

The Royal Navy and Royal Marines Charity is a member of the Maritime Charities Funding Group (MCFG) and the Confederation of Service Charities (COBSEO).

History 
RNRMC was established in 2007 as the National Charity of the Royal Navy, to fund projects and facilities that support serving personnel and veterans of the Naval service, as well as their families. HMS Queen Elizabeth is the affiliate ship of the charity.

In September 2018, Adrian Bell was appointed CEO of RNRMC, after previously serving as CEO of the Kent, Surrey and Sussex Air Ambulance for eight years. In July 2021, Sir Bill Thomas was succeeded as chairman by Dr Brian Gilvary, the former Executive Chairman of Ineos Energy.

Activity 
RNRMC distributes grants to British military charities including Walking with the Wounded, SSAFA, Scotty's Little Soldiers and Combat Stress, allowing these charities to provide support services to beneficiaries who have served in the Royal Navy or Royal Marines, and their family members. In the first decade of the charity's activity, it distributed over £50 million in grants.

The charity hosts multiple events to raise funds for its work, including an annual Beating Retreat performance, a virtual Trafalgar Night celebration, and sponsored sports challenges such as the Virtual Field Gun Challenge and Battlefield Cycle Challenge.

During the coronavirus pandemic, RNRMC distributed care packages to 650 Naval personnel.

References

External links
 RNRMC

Social welfare charities based in the United Kingdom
Charities based in Hampshire
Royal Navy